Riccarton is a former New Zealand parliamentary electorate. It existed from 1893 to 1978, and was represented by eight Members of Parliament.

Population centres
In the 1892 electoral redistribution, population shift to the North Island required the transfer of one seat from the South Island to the north. The resulting ripple effect saw every electorate established in 1890 have its boundaries altered, and eight electorates were established for the first time, including Riccarton.

The electorate was in the western suburbs of Christchurch, New Zealand, and was based on the suburb of Riccarton.

History
The electorate was created in 1893, and existed to 1978 when it was abolished.

The first representative of the electorate was George Warren Russell, who started his parliamentary career with his 1893 election.  Russell was beaten in the 1896 election by William Rolleston, who had distinguished himself through his contribution to education and his support for Canterbury Museum. Rolleston was the last Superintendent of Canterbury Province. Russell regained the electorate in the 1899 election with a majority of one vote over Rolleston, which brought an end to that political career. Russell lost the Riccarton electorate again in the 1902 election, this time to George Witty, who held the electorate for 23 years until 1925.

George Witty was successful, with Bert Kyle coming second and Jack McCullough coming third.

Before the counting of the absentee and postal votes, Langford was leading by 38 votes. The final count saw Kyle with a majority of 87 votes.

Members of Parliament
The Riccarton electorate was represented by eight Members of Parliament.

Key

Election results

1975 election

1972 election

1969 election

1966 election

1963 election

1960 election

1957 election

1956 by-election

1954 election

1951 election

1949 election

1946 election

1943 election
There were four candidates in 1943, with the election won by Jack Watts over Harold Ernest Denton.

1931 election

 
 
 
 
 

 

Table footnotes:

1928 election

 
 
 
 
 

 

Table footnotes:

1919 election

1905 election

1899 election

1896 election

Notes

References

1893 establishments in New Zealand
1978 disestablishments in New Zealand
Historical electorates of New Zealand
Politics of Christchurch
History of Christchurch